KS1 or KS-1 may refer to:

Weapons
 KS-1 (missile), a Chinese surface-to-air missile
 Raduga KS-1 Komet, a Soviet anti-ship missile

Other uses
 Kansas's 1st congressional district, to the United States House of Representatives
 K-1 (Kansas highway), an American road
 Key Stage 1, a British primary educational term